Thomas or Tom Terry may refer to:

 Tomás Terry (died 1886), Cuban business magnate
 Thomas D. Terry (1816–1897), president of Santa Clara University
 Tom Terry (meteorologist) (born 1969), television meteorologist
 Tom Terry (author), author and broadcaster
 Terry-Thomas (1911–1990), who use this stage name for a short while

See also
 
 Terry Thomas (disambiguation)